Stockholm hostage crisis may refer to:
 Norrmalmstorg robbery, 1973
 1975 West German embassy hostage crisis
 Embassy of Iran, Stockholm#Protests at the embassy, 1981

See also 
 Stockholm attack (disambiguation)